Selvish Capers (born November 13, 1986) is a former American football offensive tackle. He was drafted by the Washington Redskins in the seventh round of the 2010 NFL Draft. He played college football for West Virginia University.

Early life
Capers was born in Metairie, Louisiana and attended St. Augustine High School in New Orleans, Louisiana, where he was an All-Louisiana tight end.  As a senior, he recorded twenty-one catches for 1176 yards and four touchdowns, which earned him first team all-district, all-metro and all-state honors.  He was also a three-year starter on the basketball team. Capers and D'Andre Crittenden were the only boys to start three years in football and basketball.

Considered only a two-star recruit by Rivals.com, Capers was not ranked among the nation's top offensive line prospects in 2005, due to his tightend status. He chose West Virginia over Southern Miss, among others.

College career
Capers redshirted his initial year at West Virginia, and saw limited time at tight end in 2006.  During the offseason, he moved from tight end to the tackle position, where he started the 2007 season as the backup.  He then earned the starting job against Mississippi State and kept it the rest of his college career.  Overall, he played in all 13 games and started six during his sophomore year.  Capers anchored an offensive line that helped pave the way for the Mountaineers offense to produce two 1,000-yard rushers in Steve Slaton and Pat White.  He saw limited action in West Virginia's appearance in the 2008 Fiesta Bowl, due to a sprained ankle.

As a junior in 2008, Capers started all 13 games and saw action in more than 775 plays, including a season high 86 against Cincinnati.  He collected 56 knockdowns, including a season high eight knockdowns against Connecticut.  During his senior season, Capers was named Second Team All-Big East Conference in a poll by the conference's head coaches.

Professional career
Capers was projected to be a second or third round draft pick until he under-achieved in the Senior Bowl and the NFL Scouting Combine.

Washington Redskins
He was drafted by the Redskins in the seventh round (231st overall) of the 2010 NFL Draft. Capers was released from the Washington Redskins on September 4, 2010.  He was signed to the Redskins' practice squad on September 5, 2010. He was released by the Redskins on September 4, 2011.

New York Giants
Capers signed with the New York Giants' practice squad on October 4, 2011. He was re-signed to the practice squad for the 2012 season on September 1, 2012. Capers was later signed to active roster during the second half of the season.  He was released by the Giants due to injury, on September 9, 2013.

References

External links
Edmonton Eskimos bio 
Washington Redskins bio
Player Bio at MSNsportsNET.com

1986 births
Living people
St. Augustine High School (New Orleans) alumni
American football offensive tackles
Canadian football offensive linemen
American players of Canadian football
Edmonton Elks players
New York Giants players
People from Kenner, Louisiana
Players of American football from Louisiana
Washington Redskins players
West Virginia Mountaineers football players
Winnipeg Blue Bombers players